Harish Chandra Buxipatra (17 November 1933 – 27 October 2000) was an Indian politician from the State of Orissa. He was a member of Orissa Legislative Assembly from Koraput constituency during 1974 and in 1990 (Tenth Assembly – 3 March 1990 to 15 March 1995) and became a minister. He was an activist and writer who took active part in the JP movement.
Shri Baxipatra Joined C.P.I. in 1959 during student career. He was a trade unionist and also head of AISF of the State. Later in 1973, he joined Utkal Congress.

He is survived by one son namely Bhrugu Baxipatra and 3 daughters.

References

1933 births
2000 deaths
Members of the Odisha Legislative Assembly
People from Rayagada district